Doe Lea Viaduct is a former railway viaduct near Carr Vale, Bolsover, Derbyshire, England.

Location
The viaduct was originally, formally known as Bolsover Viaduct and is often referred to as Carr Vale Viaduct. It was a substantial, double track structure carrying the LD&ECR's Chesterfield Market Place to Lincoln Central main line over the Midland Railway's Pleasley to Staveley Doe Lea Branch a short distance south of the latter's Bolsover Castle station. The River Doe Lea passed through a culvert under the viaduct's western approach embankment.

The structure was also situated near Bolsover's "Model Village" at the bottom of Bolsover Hill.

History
The viaduct, which consisted of eight brick arches, was opened to goods traffic in February 1897, with passenger traffic following from 8 March.

The section between Chesterfield and Langwith Junction (by then renamed Shirebrook North), was closed to passenger traffic by British Railways in December 1951, due to the unsafe condition of Bolsover Tunnel and concerns over the safety of Doe Lea Viaduct, both of which were affected by colliery subsidence. Bolsover South and Scarcliffe were closed completely. Track lifting from Markham Junction, over the viaduct and on to Shirebrook North commenced immediately.

The viaduct itself was demolished on 24 August 1952 by the army using explosives. This was filmed and the film later used in a commercial war film, becoming a bridge in war torn France.

The viaduct was approached by substantial embankments from both ends. That from the eastern end was removed some years ago, but that from the western, Chesterfield, end is readily accessible as part of the Peter Fidler Reserve and can be walked westwards for about 300 yards from the reserve's Point 11.

Modern access
The Doe Lea Branch is now the "Stockley Trail" public bridleway from near Glapwell to near the location of Bolsover Castle Station. Anyone walking from the A632 end to Carr Vale Flash nature reserve or beyond would walk under the viaduct, had it still been in existence.

References

Notes

Sources

Further Material

External links
Doe Lea Viaduct: old O.S. map npemaps
The viaduct on many old maps National Library of Scotland
Bolsover railway structures Signalboxes
The viaduct seen from the air in 1952 Britain From Above (free login needed to zoom)

Lancashire, Derbyshire and East Coast Railway structures
Railway viaducts in Derbyshire
Demolished bridges in England
Bolsover
Buildings and structures demolished in 1952